Bove may refer to:

 Bove, a surname
 Capo di Bove, an archaeological site on the Appian Way on the outskirts of Rome, Italy 
 House of Bove, an ancient noble patrician family of Ravello, Maritime Republic of Amalfi

See also
 Monte Bove (disambiguation)
 Boves (disambiguation)